The Phare d'Eckmühl, also known as Point Penmarc'h Light or Saint-Pierre Light, is an active lighthouse in Penmarc'h, Finistère department, Brittany, France.  At a height of  it is one of the tallest lighthouses in the world. It is located at the port of Saint-Pierre, on Point Penmarc'h, on the southwestern corner of Finistère and the northwestern entrance to the Bay of Biscay.

The tower was built following a decision on  April 3, 1882 to modernize the coastal lighthouses and raise the focal height of the Penmarc'h lighthouse, built in 1835, to 60m. However, engineers reported that the old tower could not support such an extension, so in 1890 it was decided to build a new lighthouse, the plans of which were completed on  April 3, 1882. Funding came unexpectedly on  9 December 1892 when Adélaïde-Louise Davout, Marquise de Blocqueville, left substantial funds for the new tower in her will, provided the lighthouse was dedicated to the memory of her father, a marshal of the First French Empire Louis Nicolas Davout, who was "Prince d'Eckmühl", a title he won after the Battle of Eckmühl. The tower was inaugurated on October 17, 1897.

The centennial of the lighthouse was celebrated in 1997.

The tower is open to the public. Reaching the top takes climbing 307 steps, 227 stone steps followed by an iron staircase.

See also

 List of tallest lighthouses in the world
 List of lighthouses in France

References

Lighthouses completed in 1835
Lighthouses completed in 1882
Lighthouses completed in 1897
Lighthouses in Brittany
Buildings and structures in Finistère
Tourist attractions in Finistère
Monuments historiques of Finistère